In population genetics, a selection coefficient, usually denoted by the letter s, is a measure of differences in relative fitness. Selection coefficients are central to the quantitative description of evolution, since fitness differences determine the change in genotype frequencies attributable to selection.

The following definition of s is commonly used. Suppose that there are two genotypes A and B in a population with relative fitnesses  and  respectively.

For example, the lactose-tolerant allele spread from very low frequencies to high frequencies in less than 9000 years since farming with an estimated selection coefficient of 0.09-0.19 for a Scandinavian population. Though this selection coefficient might seem like a very small number, over evolutionary time, the favored alleles accumulate in the population and become more and more common, potentially reaching fixation.

See also
Evolutionary pressure

References

Population genetics
Evolutionary biology